17 teams took part in the league with PFC CSKA Moscow winning the championship.

League standings

 Note: On 5 January 1970 the city of Luhansk was officially renamed again as Voroshilovgrad, therefore Zorya Luhansk became known as Zorya Voroshilovgrad.

Championship play-off
On December 5 and 6 in Tashkent (RSSSF)

 CSKA Moscow – Dynamo Moscow 0:0 and 4:3

Results

Top scorers
17 goals
 Givi Nodia (Dinamo Tbilisi)

15 goals
 Boris Kopeikin (CSKA Moscow)
 Vladimir Kozlov (Dynamo Moscow)

14 goals
 Vladimir Fedotov (CSKA Moscow)

12 goals
 Galimzyan Khusainov (Spartak Moscow)

10 goals
 Valeriy Porkujan (Chornomorets)
 Gennadi Unanov (Zenit)

9 goals
 Yuri Avrutskiy (Dynamo Moscow)
 Eduard Kozinkevich (Shakhtar)
 Anatoli Vasilyev (Dinamo Minsk)

References

 Soviet Union - List of final tables (RSSSF)

1969
1
Soviet
Soviet